The Bulgarian Open Championship is an annual international badminton championships held in Bulgaria since 1985, by then known as Bulgarian International. It was halted between 1996 and 1998, and in 2000. The tournament belongs to the Badminton Europe elite circuit and become the highest level badminton tournament in Bulgaria. It changed to its current name in 2017, to differentiate it from the second badminton tournament in the country which is now known as Bulgarian International Championship.

Previous winners

Performances by nation

References

Badminton tournaments in Bulgaria
1985 establishments in Bulgaria
Recurring sporting events established in 1985